John Chalmers (born 21 September 1927 in Aberdeen) is a Scottish orthopaedic surgeon.

Biography 

Chalmers studied medicine at the University of Edinburgh. After qualifying as MB ChB in 1950 he worked as House officer in different hospitals. In 1952 he joined the Royal Army Medical Corps and became a Fellow of the Royal College of Surgeons of England one year later. From 1954 to 1957 he had his orthopaedic education at the Royal National Orthopaedic Hospital. He spent an Orthopaedic Fellowship at the University of Illinois and in 1958 was appointed as Lecturer at the University of Edinburgh. In 1961 he graduated M.D. and in 1963 also qualified as Fellow of the Royal College of Surgeons of Edinburgh.

For a period of 32 years he was Senior Lecturer and Consultant at the (old) Royal Infirmary of Edinburgh and at the Princess Margaret Rose Orthopaedic Hospital. He was an examiner for the Fellowship of the Royal College of Surgeons of Edinburgh and the FRCS Ed Orth. and for the M. Ch. Orth. of Liverpool University. In 1982 he was elected a member of the Aesculapian Club.

With his wife Gwyneth he has four children and six grandchildren.

Memberships of Professional Associations 
President of the British Orthopaedic Association 1989-90
President of the British Orthopaedic Research Society

National Committees 
Specialist Advisory Committee in Orthopaedic Surgery.
Scottish Bone Tumour Registry
Medical Research Council Committee on Osteoporosis
Surgical representative on the Merit Award Committee for Scotland

Visiting Professorships and Lectureships 
Auckland University
Dalhousie University
Hong Kong University
Hadassah Medical Center (British Council Fellow)
Basrah University
Pakistan (World Health Organization visitor)
Black Lion Hospital, Addis Ababa

Editorial Boards 
Journal of Bone and Joint Surgery
Journal of the Royal College of Surgeons of Edinburgh
Journal of the Western Pacific Orthopaedic Association
Journal of Orthopaedics
Clinical Orthopaedics and Related Research
Scottish Medical Journal

Papers (selection) 

March haemoglobinuria. British Journal of Surgery 44 (1957), 394
Transplantation immunity in bone homografting. Journal of Bone and Joint Surgery 41-B (1959), 160–179
The growth of transplanted foetal bones in different immunological environments. JBJS 44-B (1962), 149–164
Cancellous bone: its strength and changes with ageing and an evaluation of some methods for measuring its mineral content.
I Age changes in cancellous bone. JBJS 48-A (1966), 289–299
II An evaluation of some methods for measuring osteoporosis. JBJS 48-A (1966), 299–308
Bone transplantation. Journal of Clinical Pathology, 20 (1967), 540–550.
Osteomalacia – a common disease in elderly women. JBJS 49-B (1967), 403–423
Peripheral compression lesions of the ulnar nerve. JBJS 50-B (1968), 793–803
Quantitative measurements of osteoid in health and disease. Clinical Orthopaedics 63 (1969), 196–209
Geographical variations in senile osteoporosis. JBJS 52-B (1970), 667–675
Observations on the induction of bone in soft tissues. JBJS 57-B (1975), 36–45
Unusual causes of peripheral nerve compression. The Hand 19 (1978), 168–175
Aneurysmal bone cysts of the phalanges. The Hand, 13 (1981), 296–300
Spontaneous healing of aneurysmal bone cysts. JBJS 67-B (1985), 310–312
Osteosarcoma (Editorial). Lancet (1985), 131–133
Recent Advances in Great Britain (Editor). Clinical Orthopaedics (1986), 210
Fractures of the Femoral Neck in Elderly Patients with hyperparathyroidism. Clinical Orthopaedics 229 (1988), 125–130
Tumours of the musculo-skeletal system: clinical presentation. Clinical Orthopaedics 2 (1988), 135–140
Orthogerontics (Editorial). Journal of Orthopaedic Surgery 4 (1996), 7–8
Treatment of Ruptures of the Tendo-Achilles (Review Article). Journal of Orthopaedic Surgery 2000

Nonmedical Books 
Audubon in Edinburgh. Edinburgh 2003
Andrew Duncan, Physician of the Enlightenment. Edinburgh 2010
Duel Personalities: James Stuart versus Sir Alexander Boswell. Edinburgh 2014

References 

1927 births
Living people
British orthopaedic surgeons
Fellows of the Royal College of Surgeons
British beekeepers
Alumni of the University of Edinburgh Medical School
Academics of the University of Edinburgh
Fellows of the Royal College of Surgeons of Edinburgh
Scientists from Aberdeen